An Internet celebrity (also known as a social media influencer, social media personality, internet personality, or simply influencer) is a celebrity who has acquired or developed their fame and notability on the Internet. The rise of social media has helped people increase their outreach to a global audience. Today, internet celebrities are found on popular online platforms such as Facebook, YouTube, Instagram, WeChat, TikTok, QQ, Snapchat, Telegram, Twitter, and Reddit.

Internet celebrities often function as lifestyle gurus who promote a particular lifestyle or attitude. In this role, they are crucial influencers or multipliers for trends in genres including fashion, cooking, technology, traveling, video games, movies, Esports, politics, music, sports, and entertainment, etc. Internet celebrities may be recruited by companies for influencer marketing to advertise products to their fans and followers on their platforms.

History 
In 1991, with the wide public availability of the Internet and the World Wide Web, numerous websites were created to serve as forums for topics of shared interest. In some areas, this allowed users to get advice and help from experienced users in that field, which helped boost the type of information that was typically lacking in mainstream print media or corporate websites. Dedicated social media sites arose from these, where users could create profiles and make friends with other users; the first instance was SixDegrees.com in 1997. Similarly, websites that supported blogging surfaced around 1997, and gave a means for users to post long-form articles and stories of their own. Since then, forums, social media, and blogging have become a central part of communication, social life, businesses, and news publishing. Popular social media platforms include Facebook, Instagram, Snapchat, TikTok, Twitter, WeChat, and WhatsApp. 

The beginnings of online influencing can hence be dated back to the launch of digital blogs and platforms in the early 2000s. However, within the last decade, studies show that Instagram (an app holding over 1 billion users) holds a majority of the influencer population. Sometimes, influencers are known as "Instagrammers" or "Instafamous". A key aspect of influencing is their involvement with sponsors; the launch of Vamp (a company founded to connect influencers with sponsorships) in 2015 changed the scope of influencing.

There is a lot of debate revolving around the idea of whether social media influencers can actually be coined as celebrities, as their rises to fame are often less traditional and some may argue, easier. Melody Nouri talks about the differences between the two types in her article "The Power of Influence: Traditional Celebrities VS Social Media Influencer". Nouri also mentions the differences of the social impact these online influencers have. Nouri believes it is more damaging for young impressionable audiences on social media platforms, more than on previous media from the past: such as magazines, billboards, adverts and tabloids that feature celebrities. It is deemed easier to manipulate a certain image and lifestyle online, that viewers are prone to believe in.

Influencers and marketing networks 
By the 2010s, the term "influencer" was used to describe "a highly visible subset of digital content creators defined by their substantial following, distinctive brand persona, and patterned relationship with commercial sponsors." The attractiveness of celebrities to everyday society creates a sense of trust and confidence which consumers translate into the credibility of the products being promoted. A 2001 study from Rutgers University found that people were using "internet forums as influential sources of consumer information." This study suggested that consumers were using internet forums and social media to make purchasing decisions over traditional advertising and print sources. The more personable an influencer is with their audience by engaging with them, the more encouraging they would be to purchase a product. Companies nowadays are more concerned with feedback and comments they receive from their social media platforms, because consumers believe other consumers. Many rely on reviews to convince them to buy something. One bad review can cost a business a lot of revenue. A typical method of marketing between the influencer and the audience is "B2C marketing". B2C marketing, meaning Business to Consumer marketing, entails the strategies in which a business would undertake in order to promote themselves and their services directly to their target audiences. This is typically through the advertising and creating content through the influencer themselves. The intention is that their followers who relate or look up to certain influencers will be more inclined to purchase an item because their favorite "Internet celebrity" recommended it. Internet celebrities typically promote a lifestyle of beauty and luxury fashion and foster consumer–brand relationships, while selling their own lines of merchandise.

The early 2000s saw corporate attempts to use the internet for influencing where some companies engaged with forums for promotion or to offer bloggers free products in exchange for positive reviews. Some of these practices were considered unethical as they exploited the labor of young people without providing financial compensation.

The Blogstar Network, launched in 2004 by Ted Murphy of MindComet, invited bloggers to an email list to receive paid offers from corporations based on the type of posts they made. An example of this includes being paid a few dollars for reviewing a fast-food meal in their blog.

Blogstar is considered the first influencer marketing network. Murphy followed Blogstar with PayPerPost, launched in 2006, which paid influential posters at the larger forum and social media sides for each post about a corporate product. The payment rates were based on the influencer status of the individual. The very popular, PayPerPost, received a great deal of criticism as these influencers were not required to disclose their involvement with PayPerPost as traditional journalism would have, and made the public aware that there was a drive by corporate interests to influence what some people were posting to these sites. This site encouraged other companies to begin to create similar programs. Despite concerns, influencing marketing networks continued to grow through the rest of the 2000s and into the 2010s. The influencer marketing industry is on track to be worth up to $15 billion by 2022, up from as much as $8 billion in 2019, according to Business Insider Intelligence estimates, based on Mediakix data.

An article written by David Rowles titled "Digital Branding: A Complete Step-By-Step Guide to Strategy, Tactics, Tools and Measurements" provides details as to how and what techniques these internet celebrities use to get more recognition on their platforms from users and brands. "Digital branding is the sum of experiences that we have online and it relies on the provision of value." It suggests that users are already exposed to the lives of their influencers as loyal fans, its easy for them to market companies as their fans feel as though they know the celebrities they follow, when the reality differs.

Self-branding 
Self-branding, also known as personal branding, describes the development of a public image for commercial gain or social or cultural capital. The rise of social media has been exploited by individuals seeking personal fame and product sales. Platforms such as Instagram, Twitch, Snapchat, VSCO, and TikTok, are the most common social media outlets on which online influencers attempt to build a following. Fame can be attained through different avenues and media forms, including art, humor, modeling, and podcasts. Marketing experts have concluded that "[people no longer] need to be familiar with complex coding languages or other technicalities to build websites because virtually anyone can upload text, pictures, and video instantly to a site from a personal computer or phone. With technological barriers crumbling, the web has become the perfect platform for personal branding".

Types 

Depending on their rise to fame, internet celebrities may reach their audiences in different ways. Millions of people write online journals or blogs, but most fail to become internet celebrities. This is due to the volume of online creators, it can be difficult for smaller bloggers to get more online coverage. In many cases, the content does not reach a large audience and may be intended for a smaller, niche audience. If a creator has or develops a distinctive personality, it may bring them more notoriety than their content does.

In some cases, people might rise to fame through a single viral event or viral video, and become an Internet meme. For example, Zach Anner, a comedian from Austin, Texas, gained worldwide attention after submitting a video to Oprah Winfrey's "Search for the Next TV Star" competition. This is also commonly seen from a variety of other talk show hosts such as, Ellen DeGeneres, Jimmy Fallon, Jimmy Kimmel, or James Corden, who feature viral individuals on their shows. Viral videos from internet celebrities could entail a funny event happening in the moment, a popular new dance, or even a post on twitter, such as the "Alex from Target" tweet in 2014. A young girl posted a photo of a Target employee who she thought was attractive, which went viral immediately and grew his following from 144 followers to 600,000. He was then interviewed on multiple talk shows and recognized in public by fans. People can also become internet celebrities through popular meme posting, whether they are the memes themselves or they are creating content. It can be deemed as a reaction image, video, or a GIF. The meme can convey a message of feelings and emotions where an individual may have the desire of sharing on the Internet. Internet celebrities also enjoy invitations to entertainment events like the Grammys, Oscars or sport events lime basketball and football games. This is in itself a portrayal of the celebrity status they attain even in traditional mainstream entertainment circles. 

The internet celebrity concept echoes Andy Warhol's famous quote about 15 minutes of fame. A more recent adaptation of Warhol's quote—possibly prompted by the rise of online social networking, blogging, and similar online phenomena—is the claim that "In the future, everyone will be famous for fifteen people" or, in some renditions, "On the Web, everyone will be famous for fifteen people." This quote, though attributed to David Weinberger, was said to have originated from the Scottish artist Momus.

Internet celebrities, or influencers, can be broken into five different sizes: Nano, Micro, Macro, Mega, and Celebrity. Nano influencers generally have under 5,000 followers on Instagram. Micro influencers have between 5,000 and 100,000 followers on Instagram. Micro influencers are often seen as more trustworthy and relatable, making it easier for followers to perceive an interpersonal connection with them than with Mega Influencers. Macro influencers have between 100,000 and 500,000 followers on Instagram. Mega influencers have between 500,000 and 5,000,000 followers on Instagram. And finally, Celebrities are defined as having over 5,000,000 followers on Instagram.

YouTubers and vloggers

YouTube has risen as one of the biggest platforms for launching internet celebrities. Individual users can record videos of their daily lives and upload them online through YouTube. This activity is known as video blogging, or more commonly vlogging. YouTube creators (known as YouTubers), regardless of the genres or types of videos they make, have created an industry that can generate revenue from video views and online popularity. For example, Swedish internet celebrity PewDiePie uploads gaming and comedy videos on YouTube. , he has around 100 million subscribers and is the second most-subscribed non-corporation YouTuber.

Every minute, 300 hours of videos are uploaded to YouTube, and 5 billion videos are watched every day. In August 2014, Variety wrote that YouTubers are more popular than mainstream celebrities among U.S. teens. Advertisers, in an effort to reach teenagers and millennials who do not watch regular television and movies, have started contacting YouTubers and other internet celebrities. , YouTube has 1.5 billion monthly active users, and many YouTubers have millions of subscribers.

YouTubers can make money directly through their YouTube channels by using ads or sponsoring products. YouTube's AdSense program allows YouTubers to earn revenue from ads and views. AdSense has certain requirements—a YouTuber must have more than 1,000 subscribers, live in an eligible country, and have more than 4,000 hours of watch time within a year to be eligible. YouTube can be a lucrative platform for internet celebrities like PewDiePie, who made  in 2018.

Micro-celebrities 
A micro-celebrity, also known as a micro-influencer, is a person famous within a niche group of users on a social media platform. Micro-celebrities often present themselves as public figures. The concept of the micro-celebrity was originally developed by Theresa Senft and P. A. Poitier in their 2008 book, Camgirls: Celebrity and Community in the Age of Social Networks. According to Senft and Poitier, the concept of the micro-celebrity "is best understood as a new style of online performance that involves people "amping up" their popularity over the Web using technologies like video, blogs and social networking sites". A number of other researchers have published papers on micro-celebrities. According to Raun, a micro-celebrity is "a form of identity linked almost exclusively to the internet, characterizing a process by which people express, create and share their identities online". According to Senft and Marwick, micro-celebrities differ from more traditional forms of celebrities associated with Hollywood stars because a micro-celebrity's popularity is often directly linked to their audience, and the audience comes to expect a certain degree of authenticity and transparency.

Wanghong 
Wanghong is the Chinese version of Internet stardom. The wanghong economy is a Chinese digital economy based on influencer marketing in social media. Some wanghong celebrities generate profits via retail or e-commerce, through attracting the attention of their followers. Internet celebrities have become a popular phenomenon in China. For example, Sister Furong (Fúróng Jiějiě, 芙蓉姐姐) received worldwide notoriety and fame for her self-promotion efforts through online posts. According to CBN Data, a commercial data company affiliated with Alibaba Group, the Chinese internet celebrity economy was estimated to be worth  in 2016, more than China's total cinema box office revenue in 2015.

There are two main business models in the wanghong economy: social media advertising, and online retail. In the online retailing business model, e-commerce-based wanghong use social media platforms to sell self-branded products to potential buyers among followers via Chinese customer-to-customer (C2C) websites, such as Taobao. Internet celebrities may promote their products by modeling for their shops by posting pictures or videos of themselves wearing the clothes or accessories they sell, or giving makeup or fashion tips. They serve as key opinion leaders for their followers, who either aspire to be like them or look up to them.

This is comparable to the  made by Fan Bingbing (范冰冰), a top Chinese actress. Li Ziqi (李子柒), a celebrity food blogger with more than 16 million followers on Weibo, has inspired many bloggers to post similar content on traditional Chinese cooking and crafts.

Censorship in China has created an independent social media ecosystem that has become successful in its own way. For every Western social media platform, there is a comparable Chinese version; Chinese social media platforms, however, generate revenue differently. The greatest difference between Chinese internet celebrities and their Western counterparts is that the profits generated by Chinese celebrities can be immense. Unlike YouTube, which takes 45% of advertising revenue, Weibo, one of the largest Chinese social media platforms, is not involved in advertising, which allows internet celebrities to be more independent. The monthly income of Chinese influencers can exceed .

Net idols

Net idols first emerged in the 1990s through personal websites and blogs when internet became more accessible, with some selling personal merchandise such as photo books through their websites.

VTubers 

VTubers or Virtual Youtubers are entertainers that use digital 3D model avatars that are computer generated. VTubers originated from Japan and had begun in early 2010's and had risen in popularity in 2020s. The first virtual Youtuber being Ami Yamato that had debuted on May 18, 2011 , but the first official VTuber who had used the phrase "virtual Youtuber" is Kizuna AI who began entertaining in 2016. The appeal of VTubers is similar to a real person, except the entertainer may choose to remain anonymous through their VTuber persona. The 2D anime virtual avatars appealed to many Japanese fans and popularity began to spread internationally. In October 2021, there has been reported to be 16,000 VTubers around the world.

VTubers function in a similar fashion to YouTubers and streamers, with some VTubers being music artists. These VTubers that were music artists or broadcast their musical talent would be dubbed "VSinger" (Virtual Singer). Agencies such as Hololive and VShojo, scout and hire these VTubers to aid in marketing and build popularity. Their trademark character being the VTuber avatar or a 2D anime form of that character on the album covers, allowing recognition of the avatar and for the agency.

Income 

Different types of internet celebrities can make money in various ways, but most of them earn money from endorsements. Internet celebrities can use their fame to promote products or experiences to their followers, and are believed to provide credibility to products. In social media advertising, internet celebrities can be paid to advertise products. When they have garnered sufficient attention and following, they can be approached by advertising companies to help advertise products and reach a wider audience. Endorsements for fashion and cosmetic products are common for Instagram internet influencers. YouTubers tend to advertise a wider array of products, regardless of relevance to their genre of content.

YouTubers can also expand their source of revenue by creating their own products or merchandise to sell. Similarly, fashion bloggers and Instagram celebrities can earn money by promoting brands on their platforms or developing their own brands. Bloggers can feature sponsored posts in social media to make profits. For instance, fashion blogger Chiara Ferragni started as an online blogger, and then gained millions of followers on Instagram. She later created her brand, the Chiara Ferragni Collection. Like many other Instagram celebrities, Ferragni started by charging money per post for promoting brands. She now earns revenue from promotional Instagram posts and the sale of her own products.

In 2020, a report by venture-capital firm SignalFire stated that the economy spawned by internet creators was the “fastest-growing type of small business.”

Advertising regulations 
Despite the recent emergence of influencer culture, influencer marketing and advertising it is left highly unregulated by existing legislation. This became a prevalent concern when users on social media platforms were finding it difficult to distinguish any differences between advertisements and sponsorships with personal posts. This was evident with the mismanagement of Fyre Festival, where numerous Instagram influencers were sanctioned for their lack of transparency. This led to a massive backlash from the public, who felt the promotion of the event deliberately misled and confused target audiences. As a result, numerous advertising bodies sought to introduce strict regulations and guidelines around influencer marketing. This includes the AANA (Australian Associations of National Advertisers), who states that influencer advertising must be "clearly distinguishable".

Cancel culture 
Cancel culture is a form of ostracism where an individual is excluded from social or professional circles because of certain past or present actions or allegations. The act may occur on social media platforms or in person. Cancel culture is a common term among internet celebrities where they may lose their source of income, fans, or reputation because of their controversial actions. For example, Beauty Guru YouTuber Jeffree Star has faced many allegations and controversies in his career which include cyberbullying, vocally expressing racist remarks and slurs, etc. On July 10, 2020, the makeup brand Morphe cut ties and ceased all makeup collaborations with Jeffree Star because his problematic past had resurfaced. The year before that, Kuwaiti celebrity Sondos Alqattan was criticising Filipinos. As a result of this, some brands stopped working with her.

Interacting with fans 

Meetups are often a way internet celebrities interact with fans in real life. Occasionally, an internet celebrity might organize a meetup and invite fans to meet them at a certain place and time without proper organization. This can attract crowds of fans, causing disorderly or even unsafe situations. For example, Tanacon was an organization produced in collaboration with talent manager Michael Weist involving a group of internet celebrities who were set to meet paying fans, but did not follow through. Because of the disorganized setup, the meetup resulted in chaos.

Alternatively, events can be organized at a venue with security personnel. VidCon is an annual organized video conference designed for people interested in online videos. It invites internet content creators to participate in events for paying fans, such as performances, panels, and meet-and-greets.

Effect on fans 
Internet celebrities can draw in a devoted crowd of fans whether their reach is small or wide. A scholarly article published from Thammasat University in Thailand explains that the younger generation is becoming more attracted to the path of fame compared to the typical intellectual development and financial security route. The appearance of the ease and simplicity of the life of internet celebrities obstructs the reality of what this life often really entails. Seeing influencers display the highlights of their lives has shown to produce some unintended effects on fans.

Those who closely follow the lives of internet celebrities are more likely to develop psychological difficulties such as anxiety, depression, and dissociation. Although many internet celebrities appreciate the support and loyalty of their viewers and fans, the dedication to their lives can sometimes be intense. Fans may develop extreme behaviors or attitudes towards their favorite celebrities that can be identified as obsessive or may sometimes result to criminal behavior. The younger crowd are also being impacted through seeing their internet celebrities on different social media platforms. The Journal of Behavioral Addictions published by Akademiai Kiado evaluates a study that was done on Hungarian adolescents demonstrate these effects. The research found that the desire for fame on the internet was negatively associated with self-acceptance and potentially result to materialism and the desire for social recognition.

See also 

 Celebrity culture
 Content creation
 Fashion influencer
 Influencer marketing
 Internet activism
 Kid influencer
 Internet Hall of Fame
 List of Internet phenomena
 Online streamer
 Parasocial interaction
 Role model
 Social media marketing
 Usenet celebrity
 Virtual influencer
 Virtual YouTuber
 Vlogger

References

Further reading 
 
 
 "Rise of an Internet Star - Parlaying YouTube Fame Into Big Business" at ReadWriteWeb
 
 

Celebrity
 
Cultural trends
Social influence
Social media